The Constitution of 1930 was the constitution of Egypt from October 1930 to December 1935. It replaced the Constitution of 1923 until that constitution was restored in 1935.

References

See also
History of the Egyptian Constitution
Egyptian Constitution of 1879 (abortive)
Egyptian Fundamental Ordinance of 1882
Egyptian Constitution of 1923
Egyptian Constitution of 1956
Provisional Constitution of the United Arab Republic of 1958
Egyptian Constitution of 1964 ("Constitution of the United Arab Republic", provisional)
Egyptian Constitution of 1971
Egyptian Constitutional Declaration of 2011 (provisional)
Egyptian Constitution of 2012
Egyptian Constitution of 2014

1930
Constitution of 1930
Constitution of 1930
Defunct constitutions
1930 documents